

Overview

Australia v Zimbabwe

India vs West indies

Australia vs West Indies

India vs Zimbabwe

Australia vs India

West Indies vs Zimbabwe

India vs West Indies

Australia vs Zimbabwe

Australia vs West Indies

India vs Zimbabwe

Australia v India

West Indies vs Zimbabwe

References

External links
 Cricket World Cup 1983 from Cricinfo

1983 Cricket World Cup
1983 in cricket